Londres is a small tourist town in the Belén Department of Catamarca Province, Argentina. It is at the foot of Shincal mountains, near the Quimivil river and is traditionally divided into two parts "Arriba" (Spanish for Upper) and "Abajo" (for Lower), divided by the "Hondo" River.

History and naming 
Londres was founded in 1558 and named Londres de la Nueva Inglaterra (Spanish for London of the New England) in honor of the fact that  Philip II, King of Spain at time of its founding, was married to Mary Tudor (Mary I of England).

Tourism 

The Church of the Immaculate Conception, National Historical Monument is in Londres.

These are 30 hectares where reconstructions of parts of an urban settlement inhabited by the indigenous population of the area in the 15th and 16th centuries.

This city, known as "The birthplace of the nut" is home to the provincial nut festival, celebrated every year in January.

Population 

The 2001 census records a population of 2,134 inhabitants (INDEC 2001) which represents an increase of 15.7% over the 1,844 inhabitants recorded in the previous census (INDEC 1991)

References

External links  
 Argentina Interior Ministry
 catamarcaguia.com.ar

Populated places in Catamarca Province
Populated places established in 1558